Brenda Solzano-Rodney (born 22 October 1962) is a Trinidadian former cricketer who played as a right-handed batter and occasional wicket-keeper. She appeared in six One Day Internationals for the West Indies between 1997 and 2003. She played domestic cricket for Trinidad and Tobago.

References

External links
 
 

1962 births
Living people
West Indian women cricketers
West Indies women One Day International cricketers
Trinidad and Tobago women cricketers
Wicket-keepers